Ridesharing or rideshare may refer to:

 Carpool
 Vanpool
 Peer-to-peer ridesharing
 Rideshare payload, a smaller-sized payload transported to orbit with a primary payload
 Ridesharing company, a company that matches passengers with drivers of vehicles for hire via websites and mobile apps